The 1987 CCHA Men's Ice Hockey Tournament was the 16th CCHA Men's Ice Hockey Tournament. It was played between March 6 and March 14, 1987. First round games were played at campus sites, while 'final four' games were played at Joe Louis Arena in Detroit, Michigan. By winning the tournament, Michigan State received the Central Collegiate Hockey Association's automatic bid to the 1987 NCAA Division I Men's Ice Hockey Tournament.

Format
The tournament featured three rounds of play. The team that finished below eighth place in the standings was not eligible for postseason play. In the quarterfinals, the first and eighth seeds, the second and seventh seeds, the third seed and sixth seeds and the fourth seed and fifth seeds played a best-of-three series, with the winners advancing to the semifinals. In the semifinals, the remaining highest and lowest seeds and second highest and second lowest seeds play a single-game, with the winners advancing to the finals. The tournament champion receives an automatic bid to the 1987 NCAA Division I Men's Ice Hockey Tournament.

Conference standings
Note: GP = Games played; W = Wins; L = Losses; T = Ties; PTS = Points; GF = Goals For; GA = Goals Against

Bracket

Note: * denotes overtime period(s)

First round

(1) Bowling Green vs. (8) Ferris State

(2) Michigan State vs. (7) Michigan

(3) Lake Superior State vs. (6) Ohio State

(4) Illinois–Chicago vs. (5) Western Michigan

Semifinals

(1) Bowling Green vs. (6) Ohio State

(2) Michigan State vs. (5) Western Michigan

Consolation Game

(5) Western Michigan vs. (6) Ohio State

Championship

(1) Bowling Green vs. (2) Michigan State

Tournament awards

All-Tournament Team
F Bobby Reynolds* (Michigan State)
F Jeff Madill (Ohio State)
F Paul Ysebaert (Bowling Green)
D Donald McSween (Michigan State)
D Scott Paluch (Bowling Green)
G Gary Kruzich (Bowling Green)
* Most Valuable Player(s)

References

External links
CCHA Champions
1986–87 CCHA Standings
1986–87 NCAA Standings

CCHA Men's Ice Hockey Tournament
Ccha tournament